Jean Pollet (18 July 1912 – July 1982) was a Swiss basketball player. He competed in the men's tournaments at the 1936 Summer Olympics and the 1948 Summer Olympics.

References

1912 births
1984 deaths
Swiss men's basketball players
Olympic basketball players of Switzerland
Basketball players at the 1936 Summer Olympics
Basketball players at the 1948 Summer Olympics
Place of birth missing